Maalai Sooda Vaa is a 1975 Indian Tamil-language film directed by C. V. Rajendran. The film stars Kamal Haasan and Kumari Manjula. The script was written by Vennira Aadai Moorthy, and dialogue by Chitralaya Gopu. It was one of the very early films in which Kamal Haasan acted as hero.

Plot 

Kamal, a hero with unique style he attracts girls on dance show, one day evening heroine see him performances and his charming cuteness. approaching kamal for her love, but he refused to do, because he have wider westernization vision later he realize missing inner feelings full of her then joins hands together.

Cast 
 Kamal Haasan
 Kumari Manjula
 Moulee
 Major Sundarrajan
 Manorama
 V. K. Ramasamy
 Manimala
 Vennira Aadai Moorthy
 Maali
 S. V. Ramadas
 I. S. R.
 Krishnamurthy
 Ramarao
 Gemini Balu
 Selvakumar
 'Douglas' Kannaiya
 Soundarajan
 Sreenandhagopal
 Usilaimani
 Lalitha

Production 
Maalai Sooda Vaa directed by C. V. Rajendran. The script was written by Vennira Aadai Moorthy, and dialogue by Chitralaya Gopu. It was one of the very early films in which Kamal Haasan acted as hero.

Soundtrack 
The music was composed by Vijaya Bhaskar, with lyrics by Vaali.

Reception
Kanthan of Kalki wrote the screenplay is almost developed similar to Bobby, and the producers should be praised for not making the comedy too much and boring.

References

External links 
 

1970s Tamil-language films
1975 films
Films directed by C. V. Rajendran
Films scored by Vijaya Bhaskar